Christ Church North Finchley is a Church of England evangelical church in 620 High Road, North Finchley, London.

"Christ Church is a living evangelical Christian community based in North London. We come from many different backgrounds and nationalities but at our heart is a genuine faith in Jesus Christ, who makes God known through the Bible and who is active in our world now."

History 
Henry Stephens, the first vicar of Christ Church, was born in Liverpool. He arrived in North Finchley in 1864 as a missionary to the local people, especially the many railwaymen, as the railway had recently arrived in the area. He spent a great deal of time preaching in the open air.

Rev. Stephens oversaw the construction of the present building, which began in 1867 and also founded Christ Church school (now Wren Academy) and nearby St Barnabas church. The memorial tablet on display in the church building summarises his driving passion well: “Ever mindful of the spiritual welfare of his flock, he lived and preached Jesus Christ and Him crucified.” This conviction, that the message of the crucified and risen Jesus is what people need most, remains at the heart of Christ Church.

Dr Catherine Ironside was a Christ Church member who left her life in Finchley to serve as a missionary doctor in Esfahan, Iran. Following her death during the Asian Flu pandemic of 1922, the font cover was carved in her memory, echoing the famous Esfahan style. The combination of the star of David on the font (reflecting Jesus’ claim to be the Jewish Messiah) and the Persian wood carving underlines the central Christian belief that the message of Jesus is for all nations. Christ Church has always been a sender and supporter of missionaries across the world, and is now a notably diverse congregation comprising many nationalities.

References

External links 

Church of England church buildings in the London Borough of Barnet
Finchley
Diocese of London
Grade II listed churches in London
Grade II listed buildings in the London Borough of Barnet